Coll is the Irish name of the ninth letter of the Ogham alphabet ᚉ, meaning "hazel-tree", which is related to Welsh collen pl. cyll, and Latin corulus. Its Proto-Indo-European root was *kos(e)lo-. Its phonetic value is [k].

Bríatharogam 
In the medieval kennings, called Bríatharogam or Word Ogham the verses associated with Coll are:

caíniu fedaib - "fairest tree" in the Bríatharogam Morann mic Moín

carae blóesc - "friend of nutshells"  in the Bríatharogam Mac ind Óc

milsem fedo - "sweetest tree"  in the Bríatharogam Con Culainn.

References

Ogham letters